Drax Hales railway station was one of two railway stations that served the village of Drax in North Yorkshire, England. It opened to passengers and goods in 1912 as part of the Selby to Goole line and later closed in 1964 as part of the Beeching cuts. The area is now occupied by the A645 road.

History

Construction of the Selby to Goole line began in 1907 and one of the intermediate stations was placed at Drax. The line opened for freight traffic in December 1910, and the station opened to passengers in May 1912. Before Drax Hales opened, the village was served by Drax Abbey railway station. Much of the station, including the platforms were of timber construction.

The station closed to passengers in June 1964 and has since been completely demolished. In the early 1990s, the A645 road was constructed on the former track-bed of the Selby to Goole line.

Service

References

External links
 The station on navigable O.S. map
 Photo of the station from 1964

Disused railway stations in North Yorkshire
Former North Eastern Railway (UK) stations
Railway stations in Great Britain opened in 1912
Railway stations in Great Britain closed in 1964
1912 establishments in England
1964 disestablishments in England
Beeching closures in England